Pelophryne rhopophilia, also known as lowland dwarf toad, is a species of toad in the family Bufonidae. It is endemic to Borneo and found in north-eastern and south-western Sarawak (Malaysia) and (likely) in adjacent West Kalimantan (Indonesia).

Description
Males measure  in snout–vent length; females are larger. They have a slender body. The dorsal colour is dark brown with an X-shaped lighter area. There line between the darker dorsal parts and the white or cream-coloured belly is quite sharp. The belly has also black spots. The skin has warts bearing a small keratinized spine; the larger warts may be red. The fingers are truncate and have fleshy webbing.

Habitat and conservation
Males call from low shrubs. The eggs are probably deposited in very small rain pools.

The known populations occur in well-protected areas, Gunung Mulu National Park and Lanjak Entimau Wildlife Sanctuary, where the species is not threatened. However, it is likely to occur more widely and be threatened by habitat loss caused by agriculture and logging.

References

rhopophilia
Endemic fauna of Borneo
Amphibians of Indonesia
Amphibians of Malaysia
Amphibians described in 1996
Taxa named by Robert F. Inger
Taxonomy articles created by Polbot
Amphibians of Borneo